Williams Creek School is located at 5501 South Ranch to Market Road 1623 in Gillespie County, in the U.S. state of Texas. Although now consolidated with the community of Stonewall, the school is actually located south of there in the ghost town of Albert. It was established in 1891 as the Albert School,  and was originally a log cabin on Williams Creek. Six years later, it was moved farther from the creek onto a larger piece of land.  A new building was constructed of native limestone.

Up until World War I, classes were taught exclusively in the German language. The war brought a new law that not only required all classes, except foreign languages, to be in English but also banned the use of German on school property. During the 1920–1921 school year, Lyndon B. Johnson was an 8th-grade student in the one-room school.  An additional room was added in 1922 to accommodate  expanded enrollment. The school was consolidated with Stonewall in 1950.

The building is now used as a community center. The school was designated a  Recorded Texas Historic Landmark in 2002. It was added to the National Register of Historic Places listings in Gillespie County, Texas on May 6, 2005.

See also

National Register of Historic Places listings in Gillespie County, Texas
Recorded Texas Historic Landmarks in Gillespie County

References

External links

Handbook of Texas Online, Stonewall, Texas
Friends of Gillespie County Schools, Williams Creek

Defunct schools in Gillespie County, Texas
Lyndon B. Johnson
National Register of Historic Places in Gillespie County, Texas
Recorded Texas Historic Landmarks
School buildings on the National Register of Historic Places in Texas